José María Solé Chavero (born 3 July 1969 in Sant Feliu de Guíxols, Catalonia) is a wheelchair basketball athlete from Spain. He has a physical disability: he is a 1-point wheelchair basketball player. He played wheelchair basketball at the 1996 Summer Paralympics. His team was fourth.

References

External links 
 
 

1969 births
Living people
Spanish men's wheelchair basketball players
Wheelchair category Paralympic competitors
Paralympic wheelchair basketball players of Spain
Wheelchair basketball players at the 1996 Summer Paralympics
People from Catalonia